Samuel Daskam (January 31, 1823 – 1912) was Warden of the Borough of Norwalk, Connecticut from 1874 to 1877.

Early life and family 
He was the son of Captain Samuel Daskam and Lucretia Fitch. His mother was grand-niece of Governor Thomas Fitch.

On October 4, 1847, he married Arrietta M. Rogers, daughter of Colonel Henry Rogers. After their marriage, they moved to Troy, New York where he purchased a jewelry store. He then moved to Ridgefield, Connecticut, where he was rail station master.

Public service 
 In 1842 he led the Connecticut National Guard Company D. (known as the "National Blues") from New Haven to Boston
 In 1846, he was one of the five marshals appointed to receive James K. Polk, President of the United States, and James Buchanan, Secretary of State, on the occasion of the public dinner held at the Tontin Hotel
 In 1853, appointed United States marshal by Franklin Pierce, President of the United States.
 In 1875, he was elected warden of the borough of Norwalk, and again in 1876.
 In 1888-89-90-91-92-93 and ‘94 he was a selectmen of Norwalk.
 In 1896 he was one of the managers of the State Society, Sons of the American Revolution
 In 1897, he was elected delegate to the National convention, Sons of the American Revolution, at Morristown, N.J.
 In 1898, was elected a delegate to the National Society's convention, Sons of the American Revolution, at Detroit, Michigan

References 

1823 births
1912 deaths
American jewellers
Burials in East Norwalk Historical Cemetery
Connecticut city council members
Connecticut Democrats
Mayors of Norwalk, Connecticut
United States Marshals
19th-century American politicians